Alissa Katelina Pili (born June 8, 2001) is an American college basketball player for the Utah Utes of the Pac-12 Conference. She previously played for the USC Trojans.

Early life and high school career
Pili was born in Anchorage, Alaska to Heather and Billy Pili and is of Samoan and Alaska Native descent. Her older brother, Brandon, played football for USC as a defensive lineman. She played football as a lineman from third to eighth grade as the only girl in her league and started playing organized basketball at age eight. She played for Dimond High School in Anchorage. As a freshman, Pili helped her team to a runner-up finish at the Class 4A state tournament. She led Dimond to two state championships, set the Class 4A all-time scoring record and was a three-time Alaska Gatorade Player of the Year. Pili won 13 state titles across all sports at Dimond, including four in volleyball, four in shot put, two in discus and one in wrestling. In her final two years of high school, she was named MaxPreps Female High School Athlete of the Year for her success in multiple sports, joining Missy Franklin as the only two-time recipients of the award. Rated a five-star recruit by ESPN, she committed to playing college basketball for USC.

College career
Pili entered her freshman season at USC as the team's starting forward. On February 23, 2020, she recorded a career-high 32 points and 12 rebounds in a 66–60 win over Washington State. As a freshman, Pili averaged 16.3 points and eight rebounds per game, and was named Pac-12 Freshman of the Year while making the All-Pac-12 Team. She missed the first 10 games of her sophomore season with an ankle injury. Pili averaged 11 points and 3.8 rebounds per game as a sophomore, earning All-Pac-12 honorable mention. In her junior season, she averaged 7.8 points and 4.5 rebounds per game, before entering the transfer portal. She transferred to Utah for her senior season. Pili was named Pac-12 Player of the Year and earned All-Pac-12 honors after leading her team to a share of the conference regular season title.

References

External links
USC Trojans bio
Utah Utes bio

Living people
American women's basketball players
Basketball players from Alaska
Sportspeople from Anchorage, Alaska
American sportspeople of Samoan descent
Forwards (basketball)
USC Trojans women's basketball players
Utah Utes women's basketball players
2001 births
All-American college women's basketball players